USS Lebanon may refer to:

, was a collier acquired by the US Navy 6 April 1898 and sold 2 June 1922
, was a cargo ship acquired by the US Navy 25 August 1945 and decommissioned 15 November 1946

United States Navy ship names